Trojan Holdings is a major privately held New Zealand tourism company, based in Queenstown.

The company is owned by founder Sir John Davies, a former mayor of Queenstown-Lakes and prior to that mayor of Queenstown Borough. As of 2019, Davies has an estimated net worth of $140 million. Both his son Mike, and daughter Jacqui are directors of the company, and part of the management.

Notable operations
 Ultimate Hikes, running guided walks on the Milford Track and Routeburn Track
 The Hermitage Hotel, at Aoraki / Mount Cook
 AJ Hackett Bungy, significant shareholding
 NZSki, running The Remarkables, Coronet Peak and Mt. Hutt ski areas
 Coast to Coast, annual multi-sport competition
Northern Southland Transport, rural transport operations throughout Southland
Cromwell Transport, rural transport operations throughout Central Otago
AllWaste, providing waste collection services throughout Southland and Central Otago
Southfuels and Northfuels

References

Travel and holiday companies of New Zealand
Companies based in Queenstown, New Zealand